Agras is a surname. Notable people with the surname include:

 William Stewart Agras, American psychologist
 Tellos Agras (1880–1907), officer of the Hellenic Army who played a prominent role during the Greek Struggle for Macedonia

See also
Agras, Pella, a village in the municipal unit of Edessa, Greece